Baby oil is, in general terms, an inert oil for the purpose of keeping skin soft and supple. It is often used on babies for the purpose of maintaining "baby-soft" skin, but it is also often used by adults for skincare and massage.

The skin of an infant, especially a premature one, is sensitive, thin and fragile. The skin's neutral pH on the surface significantly reduces the protection against excessive bacterial growth. The epidermis and dermis are thinner than those of adults and the epidermal barrier is not yet fully developed. Consequences can for example be dry skin, infections, peeling, blister formation and poor thermoregulation. The application of different oils to the skin of the newborn is routinely practiced in many countries. In general, these oils are used for cleansing, to maintain the skin's moisture and to protect its surface. Additionally, baby oil is used for the massage of newborns and as additive in lotions and creams.

Ingredients 

Baby oils can be classified by the base formulation of the product. They are based on 

Mineral oil or
Vegetable oils.

Products based on mineral oil  
Typical components of baby oils are the highly purified mineral oil products such as liquid paraffin (INCI name: paraffinum liquidum) and vaseline (INCI name: petrolatum). These compounds are odorless and tasteless, dermatologically tested and approved, not allergenic, hydrophobic and contain no pesticides or herbicides. Preservatives or antioxidants are not necessary, because in contrast to vegetable oils, there is no risk of rancidity with paraffins. Nevertheless, the use of mineral oil in cosmetics is being criticized. Natural cosmetic companies claim that the use of mineral oil results in skin occlusion. Conventional cosmetic manufacturers and even dermatologists and cosmetic chemists argue against that and studies were not able to show any statistical difference between paraffin oil and vegetable oils in terms of skin penetration and skin occlusion. On the contrary, petrolatum-based preparations have been shown to be effective to the skin barrier function, even in premature infants.

Products based on vegetable oils 

Vegetable oils are produced by plants with the highest concentration being present in seeds and fruits. About 95% of each vegetable oil is primarily composed of triglycerides. Coconut oil and palm oil contain mainly saturated fatty acids, while other oils largely contain unsaturated fatty acids, for example oleic acid and linoleic acid. Accompanying substances in vegetable oils are, inter alia, phospholipids, glycolipids, sulfolipids, squalene, carotenoids, vitamin E, polyphenols and triterpene alcohols. To avoid rancidity, preservatives or antioxidants are added to baby oils based on vegetable oils. On cosmetic products, these oils are listed according to the International Nomenclature of Cosmetic Ingredients (INCI), e.g.:

 Cocos Nucifera Oil (coconut oil)
 Elaeis Guineensis Oil (palm oil)
 Glycine Soja Oil (soy oil)
 Olea Europaea Oil (olive oil)
 Persea Gratissima Oil (avocado oil)
 Prunus Amygdalus Dulcis Oil (almond oil)
 Shea Butter Glycerides (shea butter)
 Simmondsia chinensis Oil (jojoba oil)
 Helianthus Annuus Seed Oil (sunflower oil)

Vegetable oils are not to be confused with essential oils, both being sourced from plants.

Usage 
Baby oils are largely used as skin care products and their principle use remains as skin moisturizers. In particular, baby oils find application in the treatment of various skin diseases like atopic dermatitis, xerosis, psoriasis and other eczematous conditions. Another area of use is the oil massage of the newborn which has been a tradition in India and other Asian countries since time immemorial.

References 

Skin care
Babycare